Erica ventricosa is a species of plant in the family Ericaceae native to the Afrotropics.

Etymology
The scientific name of this species is derived from the Latin word ventricosus, which means swollen or inflated. Its common names are Franschhoek heath, porcelain heath, Italian heather, giant heather and wax heath.

Distribution
It naturally occurs on mountain slopes in the Paarl and Stellenbosch area of the Hottentots-Holland range, when the elevation is higher than 300 m above sea level.

Habitat
Population groups of these plants are normally found in well-drained acid soils with a pH between 5.5 and 6.5.

Ecology
The corolla in Erica ventricosa has an ovoid-urceolate form and is 12 mm to 16 mm in length, with a constriction at the throat. This form is no accident, as there are specialist flies with a long proboscis that are adapted to pollinate it.

References

ventricosa